Borinara Hagwon Farm is a large scale barley farm and a tourist attraction in South Korea. It is located in Gochang County and occupies more than 561,983 square meters.

History 
It was founded by Chin Iee-chong in 1960s. The farm hosts Gochang Green Barley Field Festival every year.

References

External links 

 Official website

Historic farms
Farms
Farms in South Korea
Agriculture in South Korea
1960s establishments in South Korea
Gochang County
Farm museums in South Korea